Luis Ángel Núñez Coordes (born 2 January 1999), known as Luis Coordes, is a Dominican professional footballer who plays as a midfielder for German club FC Teutonia Ottensen and the Dominican Republic national team.

Club career
Coordes signed his first professional contract with FC St. Pauli on 30 June 2017, which began at the start of the 2018–19 season. He made his professional debut for St. Pauli in the 2. Bundesliga on 12 May 2019, coming on as a substitute for Jan-Philipp Kalla in the 61st minute of the 0–0 home draw against VfL Bochum.

On 27 January 2022, Coordes joined VfB Stuttgart II.

International career
On 23 February 2021, Coordes was named to the Dominican Republic national under-23 football team preliminary squad for the 2020 CONCACAF Men's Olympic Qualifying Championship. However, he did not make the final squad as he was instead called up by the Dominican Republic at senior level for two 2022 FIFA World Cup qualification – CONCACAF First Round matches against Dominica and Anguilla on 24 and 27 March 2021, respectively.

Personal life
Born in the Dominican Republic, Coordes moved to Germany at a young age.

References

External links
 
 
 Luis Coordes en Fútbol Dominicano. Net
 
 FC St. Pauli profile

1999 births
Living people
Sportspeople from Santo Domingo
Dominican Republic footballers
Association football midfielders
Dominican Republic international footballers
Dominican Republic emigrants to Germany
German footballers
FC St. Pauli II players
FC St. Pauli players
VfB Stuttgart II players
FC Teutonia Ottensen players
2. Bundesliga players
Regionalliga players